Blue pill may refer to:

 Blue Pill (software), a proof-of-concept virtual machine based rootkit
 Blues Pills, Swedish rock band
 Blues Pills (album), 2014 debut album by Blues Pills
 Blue Pills, a 2001 autobiographical comic book by Frederik Peeters
 Blue mass, sometimes referred to as blue pill, an obsolete mercury-based patent medicine
 Red pill and blue pill, a plot device within the Matrix series in which the blue pill symbolizes the blissful ignorance of illusion
 Sildenafil (Viagra), sometimes referred to as the "blue pill" or the "little blue pill", a medicine used to treat erectile dysfunction

See also

 Red pill (disambiguation)
 Black pill (disambiguation)